Adam Resurrected is a 2008 drama film film directed by Paul Schrader and written by Noah Stollman based on a 1968 novel of the same name by Israeli author Yoram Kaniuk (the book's original name literally translates to Adam, Son of a Dog).

Jeff Goldblum stars as the title character, alongside Willem Dafoe, Derek Jacobi and Ayelet Zurer. Several major German stars, including Moritz Bleibtreu, Veronica Ferres, Juliane Köhler and Joachim Król, play supporting roles.

Premise
The film, part of which is told through a series of flashbacks, follows the story of Adam Stein (Jeff Goldblum), a charismatic patient of a fictitious psychiatric asylum for Holocaust survivors in Israel, in 1961. Adam was a comedian in Berlin prior to the Second World War, during which he was sent to a concentration camp. Adam manages to survive the war only because his pre-war act was recalled by an SS officer (Willem Dafoe), who takes Adam as his "pet," insisting he act like a dog (as he did during one of his sketches). His humiliation was his ticket to survival, as he was even forced to play the fiddle as his wife and daughter were led to the gas chambers. While he is outwardly charming and witty, Adam is tormented by survivor's guilt and delusions that he is a dog. During his time at the institution, he carries on an affair with a nurse (Ayelet Zurer), becomes a quasi-mentor to a younger patient with the same delusion of dog-hood, and has a discovery of psychic ability when he experiences a religious ecstasy as a possible messiah to the other patients.

Cast
 Jeff Goldblum - Adam Stein
 Willem Dafoe - Commandant Klein
 Derek Jacobi - Nathan Gross
 Ayelet Zurer - Gina Grey
 Hana Laszlo - Rachel Shwester
 Joachim Król - Abe Wolfowitz
 Jenya Dodina - Gretchen Stein
 Veronica Ferres - Frau Fogel

Release
The film was screened at several film festivals, including Telluride, Toronto, Mill Valley, AFI, Haifa Film Festival, Valladolid Film Festival, the Palm Springs International Film Festival and the London Jewish Film Festival. It was released in Germany on January 22, 2009.

Reception
Adam Resurrected received a mixed response from critics. The site's critical consensus reads, "Such an unusual tale might have made for a compelling drama, but Adam Resurrected suffers from narrative confusion and an emotional detachment at its core."

Adam Resurrected received several positive reviews. Gary Goldstein of the Los Angeles Times wrote, "In a less competitive year, Jeff Goldblum would have had a shot at an Oscar nod for his performance in Adam Resurrected, in which he plays Adam Stein, a mental patient irrevocably haunted by his Holocaust survival. This original drama is less glum than it might sound, thanks to Goldblum's spirited, go-for-broke portrayal and director Paul Schrader's distinctive translation of Noah Stollman's script."

Nathan Rabin of The A.V. Club graded the film a B, also praising Goldblum, whom he credits with a "stunning lead performance." He compared the film's concept with the "notorious unreleased Jerry Lewis monstrosity" that is The Day the Clown Cried, but that Goldblum's performance made Adam Resurrected work. Rabin writes, "Goldblum sells this wildly theatrical character through sheer magnetism. The otherworldly nature of his restless, nervous charisma has seldom been put to better use. Even when it flies off the rails deep into its third act, Resurrected remains strangely hypnotic."

F. X. Feeney of LA Weekly gave a rave review. He compared the film's structure to Federico Fellini's classic 8½, writing, "Where Fellini made ecstasy contagious, Schrader is after much darker vistas — the mystery of how good men fail, and condemn themselves. One cannot recommend this film strongly enough."

Stephen Holden of The New York Times gave the film a negative review, finding it unfunny and full of missed opportunities. "Savage gallows humor might have substituted for pathos. But Adam Resurrected feels so detached that there is not a laugh, nor even a wicked smirk of nihilistic glee, to be gleaned."

References

External links

2008 films
2008 drama films
American drama films
2000s English-language films
English-language German films
English-language Israeli films
Films about Jews and Judaism
Films based on Israeli novels
Films directed by Paul Schrader
Films set in 1961
German drama films
2000s German-language films
Films about the aftermath of the Holocaust
Israeli drama films
Films scored by Gabriel Yared
Films set in psychiatric hospitals
2000s American films
2000s German films